The King's Breakfast is a 1963 British musical family film directed by Wendy Toye and starring Maurice Denham, Mischa Auer, and Reginald Beckwith. It was based on the poem The King's Breakfast by A.A. Milne.

Plot

The king of an unnamed country is annoyed after he finds that there was no butter available for spreading on his morning toast. His staff try to find him some butter, which they eventually do.

Production
After the failure of their chaotic and pointedly literal illustrating of the lyrics to the traditional Christmas carol "The Twelve Days" (1953), British film director and choreographer Wendy Toye and satirical-cartoonist-turned-set-designer Ronald Searle teamed up with composer Ron Grainer to create a film adaptation of the Milne poem. The result was a hyperactive 28-minute slapstick, ballet and mime featurette that was deemed impressive enough to be invited for screening at the 1963 Cannes Film Festival. The film's success led the producer Jack Le Vien to offer Grainer the soundtrack for his prestigious Winston Churchill documentary The Finest Hours (1964).

Colour photos taken on the set give a guide to the original appearance of the film.

During production, the poem was expanded to other ideas and story lines relating to interpersonal relations within a castle environment. The characters of the Master of the King's Music, the magician, the chamberlain, the gym instructor, the serpent player, the musicians, and the Tweeney were all created for the film.

Cast
 Maurice Denham as the King
 Mischa Auer as the Master of the King's Music 
 Reginald Beckwith as Magician 
 Robert Flemyng as Chamberlain 
 Lally Bowers as the Queen 
 Warren Mitchell as Gym instructor 
 Maryon Lane as the Dairymaid 
 Richard Pearson as Violinist 
 Julian Orchard as Cellist 
 Jeremy Lloyd as Clarinettist 
 Bart Allison as Serpent player 
 Beryl Kaye as Kitchenmaid 
 Una Stubbs as the Tweeny 
 Jean Telfer as the Pantrymaid 
 Richard Hearne as 1st Footman 
 Philip Locke as 2nd Footman

References

External links

 The King's Breakfast, YouTube

1963 films
British musical films
Films about royalty
Films directed by Wendy Toye
Films based on works by A. A. Milne
Films scored by Ron Grainer
1960s English-language films
1960s British films